Preston is the name of some places in the U.S. state of Wisconsin:

Preston, Adams County, Wisconsin, a town
Preston, Grant County, Wisconsin, an unincorporated community
Preston, Trempealeau County, Wisconsin, a town